Petromuridae is a family of hystricognath rodents that contains the dassie rat (Petromus typicus) of southwestern Africa, the only extant member of this group.

The genus Petromus contains a couple of extinct species, and additionally there are fossil genera formerly of the family Thryonomyidae that were found to belong to this family instead; Apodecter, Tufamys and two species of Paraphiomys (australis and roessneri) which have yet to be placed in their own genus.

References

Rodent families
Hystricognath rodents